Carola Calello (born 12 July 1977) is an Argentine alpine skier. She competed at the 1994 Winter Olympics and the 1998 Winter Olympics.

References

1977 births
Living people
Argentine female alpine skiers
Olympic alpine skiers of Argentina
Alpine skiers at the 1994 Winter Olympics
Alpine skiers at the 1998 Winter Olympics
Sportspeople from Bariloche